The 2006 Women's Volleyball Thailand League  was the inaugural season of the Women's Thailand League, the top Thai professional league for volleyball clubs. A total of 8 teams competed in the league.

The title was won by Nakhon Ratchasima, for a record first time.

Final standing

Awards

Most Valuable Player
  Wilavan Apinyapong (Nakhon Ratchasima)
Best Scorer
  Saymai Paladsrichuay (Khonkaen)
  Amporn Hyapha (Phuket)
  Sirintra Srisuma (Lopburi)
Best Spiker
  Rattanaporn Sanuanram (Phuket)
  Amporn Hyapha (Phuket)
  Wilavan Apinyapong (Nakhon Ratchasima)
Best Server
  Saymai Paladsrichuay (Khonkaen)
  Konwika Apinyapong (Nakhon Ratchasima)
  Amporn Hyapha (Phuket)

Best Middle Blockers
  Sunisa Jadmee (Lopburi)
  Khwanjira Yuttakrai (Nonthaburi)
  Pleumjit Thinkaow (Bangkok)
Best Setter
  Nootsara Tomkom (Kamphaeng Phet)
  Kamonporn Sukmak (Nonthaburi)
  Waraporn Poomjaroen (Phuket)
Best Libero
  Tapaphaipun Chaisri (Khonkaen)
  Chidchanok Songmanee (Lopburi)
  Chadaporn Tongree (Nonthaburi)

References

2006
Volleyball Thailand League
Thailand League